Celso Yegros Estigarribia (July 11, 1935 – April 6, 2013) was the Roman Catholic bishop of the Roman Catholic Diocese of Carapequá, Paraguay.

Ordained to the priesthood in 1960, Yegros Estigarribia was named bishop in 1983 and retired in 2010.

Notes

1935 births
2013 deaths
20th-century Roman Catholic bishops in Paraguay
Deaths from Parkinson's disease
Neurological disease deaths in Paraguay
21st-century Roman Catholic bishops in Paraguay
Roman Catholic bishops of Carapeguá